Damascus Steel is the third full-length studio album by the United Kingdom-based experimental black metal band The Meads of Asphodel. It was their last album to feature contributions from Max Rael (History of Guns).

Track listing

 "Psalm 666 (Intro)" - 2:32  
 "Creed of Abraham" - 5:46
 "Hollow Womb of Suicide" - 2:53
 "Sword of the East" - 6:53
 "Satanic Black Nubian Pharaohs" - 6:39
 "Wonderful World" - 2:17
 "The Gods Who Mock Us" - 5:27
 "Behold the Kindred Battle Carcasses Strewn Across the Bloodied Dunes of Gilgamesh Mute in the Frenzied Clamour of Death's Rolling Tongue and Ravenous Bursting Steel" - 11:01
 "Beyond Death and Darkness" - 17:57

"Sword of the East" is a cover of a song done by Hawkwind.
"Wonderful World" is a cover of the song done by Louis Armstrong, with the lyrics being almost completely changed.
"Beyond Death and Darkness" is a bonus track that is an updated version of a song found on the Metatron and the Gleaming Red Serpent demo.

References

External links
Damascus Steel by The Meads of Asphodel @ Encyclopaedia Metallum

2005 albums
The Meads of Asphodel albums